Cameron Hughes may refer to the following:
Cameron Hughes (ice hockey) (born 1996), Canadian ice hockey player
Cameron Hughes (sports entertainer), Canadian sports entertainer